Tekie is an Eritrean name that may refer to 

Tekie Abraha, Eritrean football manager
Tesfaldet Tekie (born 1997), Eritrean-born Swedish football player

Surnames of African origin